Boisvin is a settlement in Guadeloupe in the commune of Le Moule, on the island of Grande-Terre.  It is located to the east of Fonds d'Or, and to the south of Guillocheau and Laureal; Gardel and Renard are to its east.

Populated places in Guadeloupe